Sunset Village is an unincorporated community in Owen Township, Clark County, Indiana, United States.

Geography

References

Unincorporated communities in Clark County, Indiana
Unincorporated communities in Indiana
Louisville metropolitan area
Indiana populated places on the Ohio River